The Kyiv National Academic Molodyy Theatre is a theatre in Kyiv in Ukraine. It was founded in 1979 and first played on 26 April 1980, with a focus on progressive productions. It is also known simply as Molodyy Theatre (Young Theatre), and addresses people "young in mind". It is a member of the European Theatre Convention, and became a national institution in 2019.

History
A first Molodyi Theatr (Young Theatre) was founded in Kyiv in 1917 by Les Kurbas, an innovative Ukrainian director, actor and playwright. He wanted to connect new Ukrainian theatre to international theatre. It was closed by the government after two years.

The present theatre was founded on 14 December 1979, when the first meeting of the theater troupe took place. It was then named Molodijniy Theatre. The first stage director was Alexander Zabolotnyi. The first performance was held on 26 April 1980, playing ... I will come back to you with spring!. The first performances showed the troupe's characteristics: unusual artistic style of theatrical performance, openness to problems, and a "fresh look on life and art". The theatre staged the first performances in Ukraine of Boris Zakhoder's Alice's Adventures in Wonderland after Lewis Carroll, the comedy Cylinder by E. de Philippo, and Y. Scherbak's Little Soccer Team. A signature production is After Two Hares, presented more than 800 times in 30 years. Stage directors at the theatre included Nikolay Merzlikin, Les Tanyuk, Vladimir Ogloblin, Viktor Shulakov, Valentin Kozmenko-Delinde, Valeriy Bilchenko, Mark Nestantiner, Dmitriy Bogomazov, Vitaliy Malahov and Dmitriy Lazorko.

The theatre was renamed Molodyy Theatre in 1995, in memory of the first theatre by Les Kurbas in the same building, and with the intention to live up to his ideas. The following year, Stanislav Moiseev became stage director. With a renewed repertoire, the theatre began to tour internationally. Moiseev collaborated with composer Yuriy Shevchenko, costume designer Elena Bogatireva, playwright Yanush Glovatskiy, and scene-designers Sergei Masloboyschikov and Andrey Aleksandrovich-Dochevskiy. A new production, Alexei Vertinskiy's Blue automobile, was awarded several European theatrical prizes. The theatre staged adaptions of works by Ukrainian Yuriy Andruhovich, including Perversion and Moskoviada.

In 2012, Andrii Bilous became artistic director. He introduced more productions per season, also on tours and at festivals, and continued the pursuit of a connection to the international scene.

The theatre began its own studio, the MolodyyStudio, in 2018. Typically three performances per season are staged by studio graduates. The theatre became a national institution in 2019. It is a member of the European Theatre Convention, with a focus on international projects and contacts, integrating "Ukrainian theatre into the European cultural space".

Stages and program
From 1985 to the present day, the theatre is based at a mansion on Prorizna Street, which formerly served as an apartment building, an officers' club, the Young Theater of Les Kurbas, and the cinema "Komsomolets of Ukraine". The theatre has three stages, a large hall seating 374, a chamber hall for 80 people, and a small hall (micro) seating 50. The usual number of new productions per year is 10–12.

The broad repertoire includes works by international playwrights such as Chekhov, Ibsen,  Shakespeare,  Vasily Sigarev and Eduard Volodarsky. The focus is the creation of advanced, progressive projects, including unusual performance spaces and open-air, addressing people "young in mind".

References

Further reading

Take. Love. Run. British Council Ukraine

External links

Official website

1979 establishments in Ukraine
Academic theatres
Theatres in Kyiv